Hiram Nichols Breed (2 September 1809 – 31 March 1893) was a Massachusetts cordwainer and politician who served as the ninth Mayor of Lynn, Massachusetts.
He also served as a member of the Massachusetts House of Representatives and the Massachusetts Constitutional Convention of 1853.

Notes

Massachusetts city council members
Mayors of Lynn, Massachusetts
Members of the Massachusetts House of Representatives
1809 births
1893 deaths
19th-century American politicians